John Watts (1864 – April 1951) was a British political activist.

Watts was educated at Audley Grammar School.  He worked for a time as a coal miner, but he retrained as a mining engineer.  In 1895, Watts was working at the Diglake Colliery, when it flooded.  He ran to warn other miners of the danger, and played a prominent role in rescue efforts, repeatedly descending into freezing water, and was as a result awarded the silver medal of the Royal Humane Society.  He later moved to work at the Mansfield Colliery in Longton, followed by work for the Stafford Iron and Coal Company.

Watts became an active trade unionist, and at the 1918 United Kingdom general election was selected as the Labour Party's Prospective Parliamentary Candidate for Stoke.  However, the local North Staffordshire Miners' Federation decided not to sponsor him, and so he was forced to withdraw, due to lack of funds.

At the 1922 United Kingdom general election, Watts did stand in Stoke, with sponsorship from the Miners' Federation of Great Britain.  He took 38.7% of the vote and second place, increasing this to 48.8% at the 1923 United Kingdom general election, but falling back to 42.7% at the 1924 United Kingdom general election.   By this point, he was a colliery manager, living in Stoke.

References

1864 births
1951 deaths
Labour Party (UK) parliamentary candidates
Politicians from Staffordshire